Redditch Borough F.C. is an English semi professional football club based in Redditch, Worcestershire. The club is a FA Charter Standard Club affiliated to the Worcestershire County Football Association.

History
Redditch Borough Football Club was formed in May 2006 originally starting out as a junior football club with only an under 10's team managed by current first team manager Julian Workman.

The club applied for the club to join the Midland Football League in 2014 and was accepted into Division 3. The club finished 4th in its first season in the league and achieved promotion the following season to Division 2 after finishing as runners up.

The 2016–17 season saw the club enter the FA Vase for the first time, but they were beaten 5–2 by premier side Rocester F.C. The same season, the club finished 2nd-place in Division Two but eventually this was taken away from them due to a 3-point deduction as the club was found guilty of fielding an illegible player against Paget Rangers, so finished in fourth place. The club currently remains in Division Two.

The club is proud to continue its history of success, signing up James Mudie for another season. The striker come centre midfielder is set for another tremendous campaign and supporters will be excited to see what he can offer.

Ground
Since 2017, the club has been based at their home Redditch Borough Community Sports & Social Club, Cherry Tree Walk, Batchley, Redditch, Worcestershire.

Honours 
Midland Football League
Les James Challenge Cup Winners (1) 2018–19
Les James Challenge Cup Runners-Up 2016-2017
Midland Football League Division Three Runners-Up 2015-2016
Midland Football League Challenge Vase Winners 2015–16
Evesham Hospital Senior Cup'Winners 2015–16
Evesham Hospital Senior Cup'Winners 2016–17
Evesham Hospital Senior Cup'Winners 2017–18
Smedley Crook Cup Runners-Up 2015-2016

References

External links
Redditch Borough on Football Club History Database

Football clubs in England
Football clubs in Worcestershire
2006 establishments in England
Association football clubs established in 2006